Helen Tworkov is founding editor of Tricycle: The Buddhist Review, the first and only independent Buddhist magazine, and author of Zen in America: Profiles of Five Teachers (North Point Press, 1989; Kodansha, 1994). She first encountered Buddhism in Asia in the 1960s and has studied in both the Zen and Tibetan traditions. Since 2006 she has been a student of the Kagyu and Nyingma Tibetan master Yongey Mingyur Rinpoche, and has most recently assisted him in the writing of Turning Confusion into Clarity: A Guide to the Foundation Practices of Tibetan Buddhism,  from Shambhala Publications under its Snow Lion imprint.

Biography 
Helen Tworkov, who became Buddhist, is the editor of Tricycle.

Bibliography
 Tworkov, Helen (1989). Zen in America: Profiles of Five Teachers. North Point Press. . (Expanded edition published by Kodansha in 1994.)

References

1943 births
Living people
American Buddhists
Buddhist writers
American writers
Buddhism and women
Hunter College alumni
21st-century American Buddhists